Amos Lawrence Jr. (born January 9, 1958) is an American football running back who played in the National Football League.

Early life 
Lawrence was raised in the Diggs Park housing project in Norfolk, Virginia.

Career 
Lawrence was drafted by the San Diego Chargers out of the University of North Carolina at Chapel Hill in the fourth round of the 1981 NFL Draft. On September 10, 1981, Lawrence was traded to the San Francisco 49ers for a fourth round pick in the 1984 NFL Draft. He was later cut during training camp. Lawrence joined the Pittsburgh Maulers in 1984 but was cut from the team after Mike Rozier was signed. He later briefly played for the Jacksonville Bulls.  

After his professional career ended, Lawrence returned to Norfolk, where he worked bused tables and sorted newspapers, among other odd jobs. His high school football coach, Bert Harrell, got him a job as an attendance officer and junior varsity assistant coach at Lake Taylor High School.

Personal life 
Lawrence had one daughter. In 1985, he divorced his wife, Ponsella Brown.

References 

1958 births
Living people
Players of American football from Norfolk, Virginia
American football running backs
North Carolina Tar Heels football players
San Francisco 49ers players